Amici (initially called Saranno Famosi) is an Italian talent show. Created by Maria De Filippi, the show began in 2001 and has since aired annually. The show is produced by Fascino P.G.T. s.r.l. (owned by Maria De Filippi) and is broadcast on Canale 5. Since the thirteenth edition, daytime and casting have been broadcast on the television network Real Time  and on the online streaming platform Witty TV by Fascino.

Amici is an academy school involving a class of about 20 youth students (16–30 age), who aspire to become professional singers, songwriters and dancers (classical, modern, contemporary, latin and hip-hop). Additional original categories of "actors", "musicians" and "TV presenters" have since been dropped after 2009.

Series overview
 Singer
 Dancer
 Actor/Actress
 Music Band
 "Big" (special contest)

Cast

Singing teachers
Giuseppe Vessicchio (seasons 1–9)
Luca Pitteri (seasons 1–6)
Maurizio Pica (season 1)
Nora Orlandi (season 2)
Grazia Di Michele (seasons 3–14)
Fabrizio Palma (seasons 3–8)
Luca Jurman (seasons 7–8, 10)
Gabriella Scalise (season 8)
Loretta Martinez (season 9)
Charlie Rapino (season 9)
Sergio La Stella (season 9)
Maria Grazia Fontana (season 10)
Dado Parisini (season 10)
Rudy Zerbi (seasons 10–present)
Mara Maionchi (seasons 11–12)
Carlo Di Francesco (seasons 13–17)
Klaus Bonoldi (season 13)
Francesco Sarcina (season 14)
Marco Maccarini (season 15)
Fabrizio Moro (seasons 15–16)
Alex Braga (seasons 15–16)
Boosta (season 16)
Giusy Ferreri (season 17)
Paola Turci (season 17)
Alex Britti (season 18)
Stash (seasons 18–19)
Anna Pettinelli (seasons 19–21)
Arisa (season 20, 22–present)
Lorella Cuccarini (seasons 21–present)

Dance teachers
Garrison Rochelle (seasons 1–17) modern
Maura Paparo (seasons 1–8) modern
Steve La Chance (seasons 2–9) modern jazz
Rossella Brescia (season 2) ballet
Alessandra Celentano (seasons 3–present) ballet
Mauro Astolfi (season 8) contemporary
Giuseppe Carbone (season 9) modern
Kris (season 9) hip-hop
Marco Garofalo (seasons 9–10) modern
Michela Villanova (seasons 9–10) ballet
Carl Portal (season 10) jazz
Luciano Cannito (seasons 10–12) neoclassical
Kledi Kadiu (seasons 13–16) contemporary
Veronica Peparini (seasons 13–21) contemporary
Natalia Titova (seasons 15–16) latin
Emanuel Lo (season 16, 22–present) hip-hop
Bill Goodson (season 17) contemporary
Timor Steffens (seasons 18–19) hip-hop
Lorella Cuccarini (season 20) musical
Raimondo Todaro (seasons 21–present) latin

Acting teachers
Fioretta Mari (seasons 1–8)
Claudio Insegno (season 1)
Patrick Rossi (seasons 2–9)
Rino Cassano (seasons 3–4)
Paolo Asso (seasons 6–7)

Non-judging teachers
Jill Cooper (seasons 1–2) fitness
Giuseppe Giannini (season 2) football
Martino Vertova (season 2) art
Paolo Evangelista (seasons 2, 13) fitness
Marco Castellano (seasons 3–8) fitness
Aldo Busi (seasons 3–7) music history
Jury Chechi (season 6) gymnastics
Pamela Prati (season 6) stage presence
Klaus Davi (season 7) communication
Pino Perris (seasons 7–18) singing
Mauro Coruzzi (season 9) music history
Gabriella Scalise (seasons 10–11) singing
Fabrizio Palma (seasons 10, 12) singing
Carlo Palmas (seasons 11, 13) singing
Eric Buffat (season 11) singing
Antonio Galbiati (season 12) singing
Nancy Berti (seasons 12–13) latin dance
Giovanni Lori (seasons 12–13) singing
Daniele Baldi (seasons 12–14) hip-hop dance
Dennis Bragatto (seasons 12–16) dance
Fabrizio Prolli (seasons 12–15) dance
Federica Angelozzi (seasons 12–15) dance
Roberto Vecchioni (season 13) music history
Fabio Raspanti (season 13) dance
Amilcar Golzalez (seasons 13–16) dance
Raffaella Misiti (seasons 13–present) singing
Enzo Campagnoli (seasons 14–17) singing
Danilo Grano (season 14) dance
Alessandro Merli (seasons 15–16) rap
Mattia Galante (seasons 15–17) dance
Roberto Angelini (season 16) singing
Annalisa (season 17) singing
Michele Bravi (season 17) singing
Natalia Titova (seasons 17–19) latin dance
Giovanni Caccamo (seasons 17, 20) singing
Emanuel Lo (season 17) hip-hop dance
Martina Nadalini (seasons 17–18) dance
Alfonso Signorini (seasons 18–19) music history
Mattia Tuzzolino (seasons 18–19) dance
Alberto Montesso (seasons 18–present) dance
Emanuela Cortesi (season 19) singing
Cecilia Cesario (season 19) singing
Agnese Valle (season 20) singing
Alberto Urso (season 20) singing
Chiara Calderare (season 20–present) singing
Antonella Cilenti (season 20–present) singing
Francesco Porcelluzzi (seasons 21–present) dance
Federica Soncin (seasons 22–present) dance

Coaches (final stage)
Emma (seasons 12, 14–16)
Miguel Bosé (seasons 12–13)
Eleonora Abbagnato (season 12)
Moreno (season 13)
Elisa (seasons 14–16)
J-Ax (season 15)
Nek (season 15)
Morgan (season 16)
Ricky Martin (season 18)
Vittorio Grigolo (season 18)
Fabio Rovazzi (season 18)
Rudy Zerbi (seasons 20–22)
Lorella Cuccarini (seasons 20–22)
Alessandra Celentano (seasons 20–22)
Veronica Peparini (seasons 20–21)
Anna Pettinelli (seasons 20–21)
Arisa (season 20, 22)
Raimondo Todaro (season 21–22)

Judges (final stage)
Gabry Ponte (seasons 12–13, 19)
Luca Argentero (seasons 12–13)
Sabrina Ferilli (seasons 12–15, 21)
Francesco Renga (season 14)
Renato Zero (season 14)
Loredana Bertè (seasons 14–15, 18–19)
Anna Oxa (season 15)
Morgan (season 15)
Ermal Meta (seasons 16–17)
Ambra Angiolini (season 16)
Daniele Liotti (season 16)
Eleonora Abbagnato (season 16)
Emma (season 17)
Heather Parisi (season 17)
Elisa (season 17)
Giulia Michelini (season 17)
Simona Ventura (season 17)
Marco Bocci (season 17)
Alessandra Amoroso (season 17)
Arisa (season 17)
Michelle Hunziker (season 17)
Gerry Scotti (season 17)
Vanessa Incontrada (season 19)
Christian De Sica (season 19)
Alessia Marcuzzi (season 19)
Stash (seasons 20–21)
Emanuele Filiberto of Savoy (seasons 20–21)
 (seasons 20–21)
Cristiano Malgioglio (season 22)
Michele Bravi (season 22)
Giuseppe Giofrè (season 22)

Dance crew
Marta Angelin (seasons 1–3)
Rossella Brescia (seasons 1, 5–6)
Kledi Kadiu (seasons 1–2, 4–9)
Ilir Shaqiri (seasons 1–2, 4)
Valerio Pino (seasons 2–3, 5, 9)
Maria Zaffino (seasons 2–8)
Francesca Di Maio (seasons 3–8)
Michele Oliva (season 3)
Massimo Sansottera (season 3)
David Sellings (season 3)
Anbeta Toromani (seasons 3–11)
Josè Perez (seasons 4–11)
Leon Cino (seasons 5–8)
Fabrizio Mainini (seasons 5–6)
Gianni Sperti (seasons 6–8)
Adelaide Seeney (season 7)
Eleonora Scopelliti (seasons 9–13)
Francesco Mariottini (seasons 10–12)
Amilcar Moret Gonzalez (seasons 10–13, 17)
Martina Nadalini (seasons 10–16)
Arduino Beroncello (seasons 10, 16)
Marbelys Zamora (season 10)
Antonio Fiore (season 11)
Michele Viola (season 11)
 (seasons 11–13, 16–18)
Hugo Cortes (season 13)
Michele Barile (seasons 14–16)
Santo Giuliano (season 14)
Marcello Sacchetta (seasons 14–20)
Anne Boidin (season 14)
Giada Lini (season 15)
Sacha Storto (season 15)
Simone Nolasco (seasons 15–present)
Gian Maria Giuliattini (seasons 15–18)
Elena D'Amario (seasons 15–present)
Klaudia Pepa (season 15)
Irene Tavassi (season 15)
Giuseppe Giofrè (seasons 15–17, 20)
Francesca Tocca (seasons 15–present)
Lorella Boccia (seasons 16, 18–19)
Federica Panzeri (seasons 16–19)
Andreas Müller (seasons 17–21)
Sebastian Melo Taveira (seasons 17–21)
Giulia Pauselli (seasons 17–present)
Virginia Tomarchio (seasons 17–19)
Gabriele Esposito (seasons 17–18)
Angelo Recchia (seasons 17–18, 21)
Bryan Ramirez (season 18)
Dante Jonathan Gerlo (season 18)
Umberto Gaudino (seasons 19–present)
Alessio La Padula (season 19)
Alberto Del Prete (season 19)
Spillo (seasons 20–present)
Giulia Stabile (seasons 21–present)
Vincenzo Durevole (season 21)
Michele Esposito (seasons 22–present)
Carlotta Di Monte (seasons 22–present)
Jon Erik De La Cruz (seasons 22–present)
Talisa Ravagnani (seasons 22–present)
Federico Milan (seasons 22–present)
Mariagrazia Tallei (seasons 22–present)
Federica Soncin (seasons 22–present)

Notable guests
During the seasons a lot of notable guests, including professional actors, musicians, and dancers appeared as guest judges or performers such as John Travolta, Robert De Niro, Carla Fracci, Raffaella Carrà, Matthew McConaughey, Kylie Minogue, James Blunt, Al Pacino, Sophia Loren, Kevin Spacey, Michael Douglas, Mariah Carey, Gino Paoli, LP, Sumi Jo, Matt Dillon, Filippo Magnini, Luis Fonsi, Owen Wilson, t.A.T.u., Paddy Jones, Laura Pausini, Alice Merton, Patrick Dempsey, Il Volo, Carlo Verdone, Jasmine Thompson, Umberto Tozzi, Anastacia, Diego Maradona, Amy Macdonald, Gianna Nannini, Clean Bandit, Francesco De Gregori, Ricky Martin, Sheppard, Plácido Domingo and Skunk Anansie.

Contestants

Season 1 (2001–2002)

Final stage

Initial stage
Alessia Natale (dancer); Alessandra Piras (dancer); Alfredo "Fred" Avitaia (actor); Chiara Bigioni (dancer); Dalila Timaco (dancer); Daniela Romano (dancer); Erika Parisi (dancer); Francesca Caselli (singer); Francesco Giannini (singer); Gabriele Carbotti (singer); Gian Marco Careddu (singer-songwriter); Giuseppe Giannico (singer); Graziano Pimpolari (singer-songwriter); Irene Humburg (actress); Marco Campanale (singer); Marco Maestrelli (actor); Mario Crocetta (dancer); Manuele Morroni (singer); Mirna Brancotti (singer); Pierpaolo Astolfi (actor); Stefano Veronese (dancer); Zita Fusco (actress)

Season 2 (2002–2003)

Final stage

Initial stage
Andrea Veschini (singer); Antonio Grosso (singer); Consuelo Varini (singer); Ettore Romano (singer); Fabio Villanis (singer); Fabio Morici (actor); Francesca Paganucci (singer); Giacomo Milli (dancer); Giovanna Martini (actress); Luca Basto (dancer); Luca Militello (singer); Marcella Di Vita (singer); Salvatore Andreoli (singer); Sara Donadelli (dancer)

Season 3 (2003–2004)

Final stage

Initial stage
Alessia Pizzichemi (dancer); Danilo Musci (dancer); Emanuela Boldetti (dancer); Emiliano D'Angelo (dancer); Katia Ancellotti (singer); Maria Letizia Arcudi (dancer); Martina Ardizzoni (singer); Michael Schermi (actor); Morena Martini (singer); Nicola Traversa (singer-songwriter); Raffaella Iavarone (dancer)

Season 4 (2004–2005)

Final stage

Initial stage
Alessandro Rende (dancer); Alexandra Fiaschini (singer); Antonio Propato (singer); Antonio Tagnani (singer); Claudia Dongu (dancer); Claudia Gusmano (actress); Immacolata Allozzi (singer); Mariangela Cafagna (dancer); Marika Vezzola (singer); Michele Manfredini (dancer); Thomas Grazioso (singer); Valentina Campani (dancer); Veronica Montali (singer)

Season 5 (2005–2006)

Final stage

Initial stage
Alberto Poletti (dancer); Albina Bondarenko (dancer); Annavita Romano (dancer); Antonello Mastrangelo (dancer); Brigida Cacciatore (singer); Fabio De Martino (singer); Filomena Caciapuoti (singer); Giovanni Fusco (dancer); Giuseppe Forlini (singer); Luca Borro (singer); Serena Silvani (actress); Viviana Filippello (dancer)

Season 6 (2006–2007)

Final stage

Initial stage
Alessio Paddeu (singer); Chiara Martegiani (actress); Corinne Marchini (singer); Emanuel Caserio (actor); Michi Pohoata (gymnast); Pamela Buggiani (dancer); Stefano Villani (singer)

Season 7 (2007–2008)

Final stage

Initial stage
Alessandra Valenti (dancer); Cristina Da Villanova (dancer); Gianluca Conversano (dancer); Luca Barbagallo (dancer); Mattia De Salve (dancer); Saverio D'Amelio (actor); Sebastiano Formica (actor); Valentina Tarsitano (dancer); Vincenzo Mingolla (dancer)

Season 8 (2008–2009)

Final stage

Initial stage
Angelo Marotta (actor); Arturo Caccavale (singer); Beatrice Zancanaro (dancer); Carlo De Martino (dancer); Daniele Smeraldi (singer); Francesca Maiozzi (dancer); Francesco Di Nicola (singer); Iacopo Di Stefano (singer); Leonardo Marki Monteiro (dancer); Pamela Scarponi (singer); Piero Campanale (actor); Serena Carassai (dancer)

Season 9 (2009–2010)

Final stage

Initial stage
Antonio Sisca (dancer); Arianna Mereu (singer); Denis Mascia (singer); Gabriele Manzo (dancer); Giorgio Miceli (dancer); Januaria Carito (singer); Maddalena Malizia (dancer); Nicholas Poggiali (dancer); Nicolò Marchionni (dancer); Riccardo Occhilupo (dancer); Rosolino Schillaci (singer-songwriter); Stella Ancona (dancer); William Di Lello (singer); Valeria Valente (singer)

Season 10 (2010–2011)

Final stage

Initial stage
Alessandro Paparusso (singer); Andrea Condorelli (dancer); Andrea Vigentini (singer-songwriter); Arnaldo Santoro (singer-songwriter); Gabriella Culletta (singer); Gessica Notaro (singer); Giorgia Urrico (singer); Michelle Vitrano (dancer); Paolo Cervellera (dancer); Stefan Di Maria Poole (singer)

Season 11 (2011–2012)

Final stage

Initial stage
Alessandra Procacci (singer); Alessia Di Francesco (singer); Caterina Licini (dancer); Chiara Giuli (dancer); Daniele Sibilli (dancer); Ilario Frigione (dancer); Legra Yunieska Sanchez (dancer); Lidia Pastorello (singer); Lorenzo Tognocchi (singer); Nicola Di Trapani (singer); Pamela Gueli (singer); Ruben Filipe Mendes Dos Santos Felizardo (singer); Sergio Nigro (dancer); Veronica Paradiso (dancer)

Season 12 (2012–2013)

Final stage

Initial stage
Andrea Attila Felice (dancer); Antonio Minini (dancer); Cristina Sangiorgio (singer); Davide Carella (singer); Etienne Pezzuto (dancer); Federica Filannino (singer-songwriter); Giacomo Garavini (dancer); Giosuè Amato (singer); Irene Rausa (singer); Leonardo Bizzarri (dancer); Lorenzo "Amnesia" Venera (rapper); Marika Calabrese (singer); Martina Monaco (dancer); Nicola Rosafio (singer); Nicole Marin (dancer); Ruben Mendes (singer)

Season 13 (2013–2014)

Final stage

Initial stage
Alessio Trimboli (singer); Angelo D'Aiello (dancer); Cesare Cernigliaro (rapper); Cristian Lo Presti (dancer); Emiliano Serra (dancer); Exxtra (rapper); Francesca Del Toro (dancer); Francesco Bertini (dancer); Giacomo Paci (singer-songwriter); Gloria Atzeni (singer); Greta Giampietro (dancer); Human Evolution (dance crew); Jacopo Paone (dancer); Letizia Rizzoni (dancer); Michael Dakhil (singer); Naomi Mele (dancer); Paolo Busti (dancer); Simons (band); Valerio Moro (dancer); Vincenzo Ficicchia (singer)

Season 14 (2014–2015)

Final stage

Initial stage
Alice Paba (singer-songwriter); Attika (band); Danilo Aiello (dancer); Esteban Morales (singer); Federico Urgesi (singer-songwriter); Francesca Miola (singer); Francesco Bax (dancer); Francesco Porcelluzzi (dancer); Gabriele Tufi (singer); Graziano Di Prima (dancer); La Gente (band); Leslie Sackey (singer); Luana Fraccalvieri (singer); Silvia Boreale (singer); Simone Baroni (dancer); Vanessa Guidolin (dancer)

Season 15 (2015–2016)

Final stage

Initial stage
Andreas Müller (dancer); Arianna Di Francesco (dancer); Aula 39 (band); Benedetta Orlandini and Luca Favilla (dance duo); Carmela Senatore (singer); Daniela Ribezzo (dancer); Floriana Poma (singer); Francesco Crimi (dancer); Gessica Taghetti (dancer); Joshua Jack (singer); Luca D'Arbenzio (singer); Metrò (band); Nevenera (band); Nick Zaramella (singer); Paolo Barbonaglia (dancer); Raft (band); Yvonne Tocci (singer)

Season 16 (2016–2017)

Final stage

Initial stage
Alessio Minnini (singer-songwriter); Elisa Vismara (singer); Erik Locatelli (dancer); Francesco Parrino (singer-songwriter); Giada Pilloni (singer); Giulia Pelegatti (dancer); Lorenzo Sorice (dancer); Marc Lee (singer); Marta Mason (singer); Raffaella Prisco (dancer); Rosario Canale (singer-songwriter); Serena De Bari (singer); Simone Frazzetta (dancer); Valentina Giardullo (singer-songwriter)

Season 17 (2017–2018)

Final stage

Initial stage
Audjah Syarifam Rachmi (singer); Claudia Manto (dancer); Elliot Horne (singer); Emanuele Avino (singer-songwriter); Federico Baroni (singer-songwriter); Grace Cambria (singer); Luca Vismara (singer); Nicolas De Souza (dancer); Nicole Vergani (singer); Orion Pico (dancer); Paola De Filippis (dancer); Silvia Belluco (singer); Simone "Mose" Reo (rapper); The Jab (band); Vittorio Ardovino (dancer)

Season 18 (2018–2019)

Final stage

Initial stage
Alessandro Casillo (singer); Anna Maria "Mimmi" Cicarelli (dancer); Arianna Forte (dancer); Bad Matty (dancer); Daniel Piccirillo (singer); Daniele Nocchi (dancer); Ellynora (singer); Federica Marinari (singer); Federico Milan (dancer); Giacomo Eva (singer-songwriter); Gianmarco Galati (dancer); Giusy Romaldi (dancer); Kevin Payne (singer); Matteo "Yamatt" Galvani (rapper); Marco Alimenti (dancer); Miguel Chavez (dancer); Noemi Cainero (singer); Samuel Santarelli (dancer)

Season 19 (2019–2020)

Final stage

Initial stage
Alioscia Grossi (dancer); Ayoub Haraka (dancer); Devil Angelo (rapper); Federico Pietrucci (dancer); Francesca Sarasso (singer); Giorgia Lopez (dancer); Giorgio "Skioffi" Iacobelli (rapper); Giuseppe Preziosa (dancer); Inico (band); Karina Samoylenko (dancer); Matteo Cogliandro (dancer); Michelangelo Vizzini (singer-songwriter); Sofia Di Benedetto (dancer); Stefano Farinetti (singer)

Season 20 (2020–2021)

Final stage

Initial stage
Arianna Gianfelici (singer); Elisabetta Ivankovich (singer); Evandro Ciaccia (singer-songwriter); Federica "Kika" La Rocca (singer); Giulio Musca (singer); Letizia Bertoldi (singer); Riccardo Guarnaccia (dancer)

Season 21 (2021–2022)

Final stage

Initial stage
Alessandra "Ale" Cicariello (singer-songwriter); Andrea "Kandy" Curiale (singer); Andrea Siragusa (singer); Cosmary Fasanelli (dancer); Cristiano La Bozzetta (dancer); Elena Manuele (singer); Elisabetta Ivankovich (singer); Flavia "Flaza" Zardetto (singer-songwriter); Giacomo Vianello (singer); Guido Sarnataro (dancer); Inder Singh (trapper); Maria "Rea" Mircea (singer-songwriter); Mattias Nigiotti (dancer); Mattia Zenzola (dancer); Mirko Masia (dancer); Nicol Castagna (singer-songwriter); Simone Russo (singer-songwriter); Tommaso Cesana (singer); Virginia Vorraro (dancer)

Season 22 (2022–2023)

Final stage

Initial stage
Andre Mandelli (singer); Andrea Ascanio (singer-songwriter); Asia Bigolin (dancer); Benedetta Vari (dancer); Claudia Bentrovato (dancer); Eleonora Cabras (dancer); Lorenzo "Jore" Longoni (singer-songwriter); Ludovica Grimaldi (dancer); Diego "Mezkal" Taralletto De Falco (singer-songwriter); Marco "Niveo" Fasano (singer-songwriter); Pasquale "Paki" Brunetti (dancer); Rita Pompili (dancer); Samuel Antinelli (dancer); Tommy Dali (singer-songwriter); Valeria "Guera" Mancini (singer-songwriter); Vanessa Bellini (dancer)

'Final stage' ratings

Amici Speciali 
Amici Speciali was a spin-off of the talent show Amici, hosted by Maria De Filippi, aired in primetime on Canale 5 from 15 May 2020 to 5 June 2020, with the intention of financing the Italian Civil Protection during the COVID-19 pandemic. The talent show included some former competitors from past editions of Amici and from other talent shows, divided into two teams, white and blue. The two teams were judged by professionals from the world of entertainment and television, including Sabrina Ferilli, Gerry Scotti, Eleonora Abbagnato and Giorgio Panariello.

The contestant were the singers Alberto Urso, Gaia, Giordana Angi, The Kolors, Irama, Michele Bravi, Random, and the dancers Andreas Müller, Alessio Gaudino, Gabriele Esposito, Javier Rojas, Umberto Gaudino.

Sanremo participation and singers sales 
The singers launched by the television program have sold over 19,360,000 copies certified by Fimi combined, becoming the talent show with the highest number of sales in Italy.

References

External links
  

Television in Italy
Mediaset
Talent shows
Italia 1 original programming